Antón Lamazares (born 1954) is a Spanish painter, who is, along with José María Sicilia, Miquel Barceló and Víctor Mira, a member of the "generación de los 80". Working elaborate surfaces of wood and cardboard with varnish and other materials, he has created a very personal medium and artistic language. From an initially playful expressionism, his style has developed toward abstract expressionism and straightforward abstraction, and, more recently, a sort of minimalism in which an intimate dialogue between soul and memory, the spiritual and the sensual, poetry and dream-life can take place. His works have been exhibited throughout the world and are held by numerous important institutions, including the National Museum Reina Sofía, the Galician Centre for Contemporary Art, the Madrid Museum of Contemporary Art and the Marugame Hirai Museum of Japan, as well as by many private collectors and foundations.

Biography

Early years: painting and poetry
(Galicia, 1954–1977)

Lamazares was born on 2 January 1954 in Maceira, a village in Lalín (Pontevedra, Spain), whose rural environment left a deep impact on his imagery and creative process. Much of his early schooling (1963–1969) took place at the Franciscan seminary of Herbón where he devoted himself to the study of literature, mostly Latin and Greek classics. In the late 1960s he began writing poetry and developed friendships with the writer Álvaro Cunqueiro and the painters Laxeiro and Manuel Pesqueira, who would become formative influences. As his creative vocation began to shift from poetry toward painting, he undertook lengthy travels throughout Europe (1972) to study in person work by the masters he revered, including, Paul Klee, Rembrandt and Joan Miró, to whom would be added Antoni Tàpies, Manuel Millares, Alberto Giacometti and Francis Bacon, as well as Medieval art and the Art of Oceania.

At the conclusion of his travels he stayed briefly in Barcelona, where he took a job as a construction worker, studying the works in its museums, particularly the collections of Romanesque art at the Marés Museum and the National Art Museum of Catalonia in his free time. In Madrid, where he next alighted, he resumed contact with his maestro, Laxeiro, and got to know the poet Carlos Oroza, whose friendship would remain essential for him: the dialogue between painting and poetry is a constant in all of his work.

In 1973, at the age of only 19, Lamazares had already begun exhibiting his paintings in group and solo shows. In 1975 he began his compulsory military service in the Navy, in Ferrol. On September 27 of that year he learned the startling news of the final executions by the Franco regime, following the Burgos Trial; one of the executed culprits was his friend Humberto Baena, a 24-year-old from Pontevedra. The news sank Lamazares into a deep depression, resulting in a period of psychiatric institutionalization. It was during this time that he would write his collection of poems, Adibal.

From expressionism and Arte Povera to bifacial painting
(Madrid-New York, 1978–1989)

In 1978 Lamazares moved to Madrid, where he formed a close friendship with the painter Alfonso Fraile, as well as with the gallerist Juana Mordó, the art critic and poet Santiago Amón and the neurologist Alberto Portera, the link to a large group of artists –writers, filmmakers, musicians and painters– who would meet on weekends at his country house in Mataborricos, where Lamazares would mount an open-air exhibition of his work in 1979. That same year he would meet Joan Miró, and travel through Provence to acquaint himself with the landscape of Van Gogh, Picasso, Cézanne or Matisse.

The 1980s were a time of intense creative activity and broad diffusion of his work: by the age of 30, Lamazares had already carved out a space in the panorama of Spanish as well as international art. His paintings of the time show playful and dreamlike figures depicted in an expressionistic mode, intensely chromatic and powerfully original. He exhibited at Juana Mordó's gallery in Madrid, at Elisabeth Frank's in Belgium and at the Sala Gaspar in Barcelona. Soon he moved to New York City, where he would remain for two years on a Fulbright Scholarship. There, his painting, which he exhibited at the Bruno Fachetti Gallery, developed in a direction at once purer and more material. For a period he divided his time between New York and Salamanca. In 1988 he traveled through Anatolia –visiting the temple of Didyma as a tribute to Hölderlin's Hyperion– and Istanbul, where he was deeply impressed by the Byzantine churches. Imagery reflecting his experience, articulated by the arrangement of wood in the paintings, can be seen in the work exhibited at Galería Miguel Marcos. In 1990 he began preparing a new series of works, designed to be looked at from both sides, which he calls bifrontes (bifacials).

Sculptural painting and large formats
(Paris-Madrid, 1990–2003)

In 1990 and 1991, Lamazares came to Paris on a stipend from the Cité des Arts, and in 1991 he opened a large studio in Madrid, where he began to work on the series Gracias vagabundas (Wandering Graces) and Desazón de vagabundos (The Anxiety of Vagabonds). In 1993 he met Tàpies and published an extensive interview with him subsequent to Tàpies having been awarded the Golden Lion at the Venice Biennale. Invited by the Galician Centre for Contemporary Art, he spent May to November 1996 in Galicia painting the series Gracias do lugar: Eidos de Rosalía, Eidos de Bama (The place's charm: Rosalía's fields, Bama’s fields). From June to November 1997 he worked outdoors in Santa Baia de Matalobos on Bés de Santa Baia. That same year he became acquainted with the sculptor Jorge Oteiza, a lengthy conversation with whom is filmed by Chus Gutiérrez. In 1998, in Madrid, he painted the series Titania e Brao, a tribute to the Castilian summer, and subsequently Pol en Adelán.

During this time, he also created numerous graphic works, including a suite of etchings to accompany five texts by Gustavo Martín Garzo in the artist's book El Canto de la Cabeza (Galería Sen, Madrid) and the lithographs that accompany Itinerarium by Egeria (Raiña Lupa, Paris), a work that was nominated as book of the year by Le Monde Diplomatique. In 2001 he mounted a grand-scale exhibition at the Seaport of A Coruña, under the title Un saco de pan duro (A Bag of Hard Bread).

His work was chosen for international promotion, along with that of other Spanish artists such as Antonio Saura, Martín Chirino, Joan Hernández Pijuan, Millares, Pablo Serrano, Oteiza and Tàpies by the Ministry of Foreign Affairs under its program Spanish Art for the Outside World. Around this time Lamazares traveled to Florence and Assisi to examine works of Renaissance art as well as to gain familiarity with the milieu of Saint Francis, to whom he would dedicate his new series, Follente Bemil.

From abstraction to poetic minimalism
(Berlin, since 2004)

In 2004, Lamazares moved to Berlin, where he has been living ever since. Following the death of his father he began the series E fai frío no lume (It’s Cold in the Fire). He was the subject of large exhibitions in Slovenia and in the Museum (Church) Kiscelli in Budapest (Hungary).

Subsequently he devoted himself to the series Domus Omnia, and collaborated in the creation of two further artist's books by Oroza: Deseo sin trámite (Aguatinta, Vigo) with a serigraph and Un sentimiento ingrávido recorre el ambiente (Raiña Lupa, Paris) to which he contributed five lithographs.

In 2008 he exhibited Horizonte sin dueño (Unowned Horizon) in the National Gallery of Jordan (Amman) and an anthology of his graphic work in the Cervantes Institute of Damascus (Syria), where the poet Taher Riyad dedicated the collection of poems Cantos de Lamazares to him. In 2009 he exhibited his work at the Queen Sofía Spanish Institute in New York, as well as in Ourense (Spain), at the Cultural Centre of the Delegation. He also participated in a traveling exhibition dedicated to the poet Vicente Aleixandre and received the Laxeiro Prize honoring his life's work and its international renown. In 2010 he exhibited his work at the University Church, in Santiago de Compostela, and in Tui, where the documentary Horizonte sin dueño, was screened at its international film festival Play-Doc. The film, directed by the siblings Nayra and Javier Sanz (Rinoceronte Films), presents a journey through the universe of painting, poetry and nature from the perspective of Antón Lamazares.

On 20 May 2010 the University of Santiago de Compostela awarded him its Insignia de Oro (Golden Shield). This was the first time in six centuries that this honor was conferred upon an artist. On 28 June 2010, during a ceremony held at the Igrexa de San Domingos de Bonaval, the Xunta de Galicia, conferred upon him the Medalla Castelao, acknowledging "the perfection, the symbolism and the transcendency of the works" as a reflection of the devotion to and faith "in the culture, the history and the essence of a people."

See also
Abstract art
Expressionism
Minimalism
Contemporary art
List of Spanish painters

References

Notes

Bibliography
AMÓN, Santiago, "La pintura de Lamazares y la luz crepuscular", Lamazares 1978-1986, A Coruña, Durán, 1986.
CALVO SERRALLER, Francisco, "La musa en cueros", Madrid, Montenegro, 1986; "Casa de la pintura", Domus Omnia, Madrid, Álvaro Alcázar, 2007.
CASTRO, Fernando, "Fragmentos de un texto que no pude escribir", Antón Lamazares. Un saco de pan duro, A Coruña, Ayto. de La Coruña, 2001.
CASTRO, Luisa, "Alma en lunes o la noche de las estrellas que brillan poco", Antón Lamazares. Alma en lunes, Ourense, Museo Municipal, 2002.
FUENTES FEO, Javier, "Inventar y divulgar nuevos secretos. En torno a la pintura de Antón 	Lamazares", Lamazares, Madrid, SEACEX, 2005.
GABILONDO, Ángel, "Del verde llover", Antón Lamazares. Gracias do lugar, Santiago de Compostela, CGAC, 1997; "Una conversación entre Ángel Gabilondo y Antón Lamazares" (entrevista), Lamazares, Madrid, SEACEX, 2005.
LOGROÑO, Miguel, "Todos los ojos del mundo", Reconocimientos. Colección Miguel Logroño, Santander, Museo de Bellas Artes, 2007.
MARTÍN GARZO, Gustavo, "Jonás y la calabacera", Antón Lamazares. Iles Quén, Madrid, La Caja Negra, 2000.
MIKUŽ, Jure, "La imagen original bajo las capas del palimpsesto de la conciencia", Lamazares, Madrid, SEACEX, 2005.
MOURE, Gloria, "Antón Lamazares", Artforum, Nueva York, mayo de 1987.
MURADO, Miguel-Anxo, "Hermana carne", Follente Bemil, Madrid, Metta, 2003.
RIVAS, Manuel, "La leyenda de Antón Lamazares", Antón Lamazares, Murcia, Palacio Almudí, 1995.
SANDOVAL, Michael, "Antón Lamazares. The Vagabond Shaman", Antón Lamazares, Nueva York, Queen Sofía Spanish Institute, 2009.

External links
Documentary about Lamazares at Play-Doc
Lamazares at SEACEX
Works by Lamazares at the Colección Caixanova
Lume na fonte. Exhibition for the "Xacobeo 2010" in Santiago de Compostela
La pintura de Lamazares y la luz crepuscular by Santiago Amón 
Exhibition catalogue of Domus Omnia & E fai frío no lume 
Website of painter Antón Lamazares

1954 births
Spanish contemporary artists
20th-century Spanish painters
20th-century Spanish male artists
Spanish male painters
21st-century Spanish painters
Abstract artists
Spanish Expressionist painters
Minimalist artists
Living people
21st-century Spanish male artists